Wissam El Bekri (born 16 June 1984 in Thiais) is a footballer who plays defender. Born in France, he represented Tunisia at international level.

External links
 
 

1984 births
Living people
Citizens of Tunisia through descent
Tunisian footballers
Tunisia international footballers
2008 Africa Cup of Nations players
French sportspeople of Tunisian descent
Association football defenders
LB Châteauroux players
CS Hammam-Lif players
Ligue 2 players
Espérance Sportive de Tunis players
Dijon FCO players
People from Thiais
Footballers from Val-de-Marne
French footballers